Uffa or UFFA may refer to:

Uffa or Wuffa of East Anglia, 6th-century king of East Anglia
Uffa Fox (1898–1972), English boat designer and sailing enthusiast
UFFA, anarchist youth house in Trondheim, Norway
UFFA (Uganda), Uganda Freight Forwarders Association, formed in 2001
 UFFA, acronym in the Knowledge-Centered Support (KCS) methodology that stands for Use It, Flag It, Fix It, Add It

See also
 Uffà! Uffà!, 1980 album by Italian singer-songwriter Edoardo Bennato